Gyula Kakas (also known as Gyula Kokas; March 28, 1875 – February 25, 1928) was a Hungarian gymnast.  He competed at the 1896 Summer Olympics in Athens. Kakas competed in the parallel bars, horizontal bar, vault, and pommel horse individual events.  He did not win any medals in those competitions, though his exact place in each is unknown.

References

External links

  (Excerpt available at )

1875 births
1928 deaths
Gymnasts from Budapest
Hungarian male artistic gymnasts
Gymnasts at the 1896 Summer Olympics
Gymnasts at the 1900 Summer Olympics
Olympic gymnasts of Hungary
19th-century sportsmen